Lars Mattsson (born 17 January 1932) is a Swedish alpine skier. He competed in the men's downhill at the 1956 Winter Olympics.

References

External links
 

1932 births
Living people
Swedish male alpine skiers
Olympic alpine skiers of Sweden
Alpine skiers at the 1956 Winter Olympics
People from Gällivare Municipality
Sportspeople from Norrbotten County
20th-century Swedish people